Madcap Theater is a shortform improvisational comedy group located in Westminster, Colorado. Opened in 2006 by improv actors Russ Faillaci and Brian Harper, the group performs weekly improv shows and offers improv classes. In 2007, 2008, and 2009, it was voted Denver's best live comedy venue by ABC Channel 7. Unique from many other improvisational comedy groups, Madcap performs family-friendly, clean comedy.

The theater closed in 2017.

See also

 Improvisational theatre
 List of improvisational theatre companies

References

External links

Improvisational theatre
Improvisational troupes
American comedy troupes